Aleksi Litovaara (born 22 April 1976) is a Finnish snowboarder. He competed in the men's halfpipe event at the 1998 Winter Olympics. From 2001 to 2010 Litovaara hosted, shot, and produced his own TV show Aleksi Litovaara Snowboarding.

References

1976 births
Living people
Finnish male snowboarders
Olympic snowboarders of Finland
Snowboarders at the 1998 Winter Olympics
Sportspeople from Helsinki